Whitney is an unincorporated area and census-designated place (CDP) adjacent to the city of Spartanburg in Spartanburg County, South Carolina, United States. It was first listed as a CDP prior to the 2020 census with a population of 4,409.

The CDP is in central Spartanburg County and is bordered to the southwest by the city of Spartanburg. It is bordered to the west by South Carolina Highway 9, to the northwest by Interstate 85 Business, and to the southeast by the Blue Ridge Subdivision railroad line of CSX Transportation. Besides Spartanburg, neighboring communities are Drayton to the southeast, Hilltop to the west, and Valley Falls to the northwest.

U.S. Route 221 (Chesnee Highway) is the main road through Whitney. It leads southwest into Spartanburg and north  to Rutherfordton, North Carolina. Lawsons Fork Creek runs through Whitney, flowing southeast toward the Pacolet River, a tributary of the Broad River.

Demographics

2020 census

Note: the US Census treats Hispanic/Latino as an ethnic category. This table excludes Latinos from the racial categories and assigns them to a separate category. Hispanics/Latinos can be of any race.

References 

Census-designated places in Spartanburg County, South Carolina
Census-designated places in South Carolina